Gerald Craft "Bones" Weatherly (December 26, 1928 – December 28, 2004) was an American football linebacker who played five seasons with the Chicago Bears of the National Football League. He was drafted by the Chicago Bears in the eighth round of the 1949 NFL Draft. Weatherly retired mid-season 1955 with a broken leg. He played college football at Rice University where he was inducted into the Hall of Fame in 1974. He attended Cuero High School in Cuero, Texas.

References

External links
Just Sports Stats

1928 births
2004 deaths
Players of American football from Houston
American football linebackers
Rice Owls football players
Chicago Bears players
People from Cuero, Texas